Aleh Popel (born 1 January 1983) is a retired Belarusian professional footballer.

Honours
MTZ-RIPO Minsk
Belarusian Cup winner: 2004–05, 2007–08

External links

1983 births
Living people
Belarusian footballers
Belarusian expatriate footballers
Expatriate footballers in Russia
FC Neman Grodno players
FC Lokomotiv Moscow players
FC Savit Mogilev players
FC Gomel players
FC Partizan Minsk players
FC Granit Mikashevichi players
FC Smorgon players
Association football defenders